The Palawan massacre occurred on 14 December 1944, during World War II, near the city of Puerto Princesa in the Philippine province of Palawan. Allied soldiers, imprisoned near the city, were killed by Imperial Japanese soldiers. Only eleven men managed to survive.

Background
On 12 August 1942, 300 American prisoners arrived on two transport ships, survivors of the Battle of Bataan and the Battle of Corregidor. They were interned in the old Philippine Constabulary barracks, referred to as Palawan's Prison Camp 10A, or Palawan Barracks. They would spend the next two years clearing an area , and then building a  concrete runway, using only hand tools, wheelbarrows and two small cement mixers. The prisoners were also forced to build revetments for 150 Japanese planes. Sick and useless prisoners were switched with healthier ones out of Manila during construction. On 22 September 1944, half of the prisoners were sent back to Manila. By October 1944, the airstrip and nearby harbor came under allied attack. Shelter A held 50 men, Shelter B held 35, and Shelter C held up to 30, and were augmented by smaller 2–3 man shelters. Shelter had a hidden exit that extended beyond the camp's barbed wire to a  cliff overlooking the bay. Army Capt. Fred Bruni was the senior officer amongst the prisoners. Dr. Carl Mango, and Dr. Henry Knight, a dentist, were also amongst the prison population. Beatings were common, and rations eventually reduced to a mess kit of rice per day. There were 4 prison escape attempts. The first, on 11 August 1942, was made by 6 prisoners, 5 of whom were able to join the Filipino guerrillas at Brooke's Point in south Palawan. The second attempt, on 29 August 1942, by 2 prisoners was also successful through the aid of friendly Filipino guides. The third in February 1943, and the fourth on 28 June 1943, were not successful.

In August 1944, 1800 men of the 131st Battalion, 2nd Air Division, were assigned to defend the airfield, under the command of Capt. Kojima. In December 1944, he sought advice "as to action to take regarding the POWs at the time of enemy landing." Lt. Gen. Seiichi Terada, 2nd Air Division commander, after conferring with Gen. Tominaga, 4th Army Commander, sent the following reply:
"At the time of the enemy landing, if the POWs are harboring an enemy feeling, dispose of them at the appropriate time."

Massacre
In order to prevent the rescue of prisoners of war by the advancing Allies, on 14 December 1944, units of the Japanese Fourteenth Area Army under the command of General Tomoyuki Yamashita, brought the POWs back to their own camp. An air raid warning was sounded to get the prisoners into the shelter trenches, the 150 prisoners of war at Puerto Princesa entered those trenches, and the Japanese soldiers set them on fire using barrels of gasoline.

Prisoners who tried to escape the flames were shot down by machine gun fire. Others attempted to escape by climbing over a cliff that ran along one side of the trenches, but were later hunted down and killed. Only 11 men escaped the slaughter; 139 were killed.

Those that did escape to southern Palawan, and eventual rescue, were aided by Filipino scouts and guerrillas under the command of Nazario Mayor.

Aftermath

Of the victims, 123 are buried in a mass grave at Jefferson Barracks National Cemetery, St. Louis, Missouri.

The incident sparked a series of POW rescue campaigns by the US, such as the raid at Cabanatuan on January 30, 1945, the raid at Santo Tomas Internment Camp on February 3, 1945, the raid of Bilibid Prison on February 4, 1945, and raid at Los Baños on February 23, 1945. It was the testimony of survivor Pfc. Eugene Nielsen that convinced the US military to embark on a campaign to save the POWs in the Philippines in 1945. In 2006, Nielsen was interviewed again by Geoffrey Panos on behalf of the University of Utah.

Bones from the victims were discovered in early 1945.

After the war, survivors Glenn McDole and Doug Bogue helped the US War Crimes Branch identify former guards and officers detained in Sugamo Prison, and interrogated in Tokyo's Dai-Ichi Building. Of the 33 charged with war crimes, 16 were put on trial, and 6 were acquitted. Those found guilty on 8 November 1948 included Lt. Gen. Seiichi Terada, sentenced to a life term, Master Sergeant Taichi Deguchi, sentenced to be hanged but later commuted to a 30-year sentence by Gen. Douglas MacArthur, Superior Private Tomisaburo Sawa, sentenced to 5 years, head cook Manichi Nishitani, sentenced to 5 years, Lt. Gen. Kizo Mikama, sentenced to 12 years and Lt. Col. Mamoru Fushimi, sentenced to 10 years, while the remaining four were sentenced to 2–5 years. However, on December 31, 1958, all those remaining in prison were freed under a general amnesty for Japanese war crimes prisoners.

The diary of a Japanese sergeant major had the following entry for 15 December 1944:
Due to the sudden change of situation, the 150 prisoners of war were executed. Those who escaped were discovered this morning in the Puerto Princessa antiaircraft trench and were shot. They truly died a pitiful death.Another officer, Lieutenant Colonel Satoshi Oie, was tried separately. He was found guilty of having unrelated crimes related to the murders of Filipino and Chinese civilians, sentenced to death, and executed by firing squad in Japan on 23 October 1948.

Appearance in literature
The massacre most recently has been the subject of the book As Good as Dead, the Daring Escape of American POWs From a Japanese Death Camp: Stephen L. Moore  and also the basis for the book Last Man Out: Glenn McDole, USMC, Survivor of the Palawan Massacre in World War II by Bob Wilbanks, and the opening scenes of the 2005 Miramax film, The Great Raid.

Evidence of the episode has been recorded by two of the eleven survivors: Glenn McDole and Rufus Willie Smith from the 4th US Marines.

See also
 Iwahig Prison and Penal Farm

References 

Japanese war crimes
1944 in Japan
1944 in the Philippines
1944 murders in the Philippines
Conflicts in 1944
Mass murder in 1944
Massacres in 1944
History of Palawan
Massacres committed by Japan
Massacres in the Philippines
War crimes in the Philippines
World War II massacres
World War II prisoner of war massacres
December 1944 events